Unfinished Business is the debut studio album by English singer Nathan Sykes. It was released on 11 November 2016, by Global Entertainment and Def Jam Recordings. The album features two guest vocals from American singer Ariana Grande, and American rapper G-Eazy.

Background
In 2014, the concept for the album came about when the British-based dance-pop band The Wanted began parted ways with each other on a hiatus, while Nathan himself decided that he wanted to pursue a solo career. In March 2015, Sykes debuted as a solo artist and released his first music video for the track, called "More Than You'll Ever Know" on his Vevo account. Sykes went on his first solo tour on 8 April 2015, which included six sold-out shows in the United Kingdom. Sykes announced via the app Periscope that the debut single from his album would be called "Kiss Me Quick". The single was released on 28 June 2015. On 21 May 2015, Sykes released a music video for his debut single, "Kiss Me Quick" on his Vevo account. The song peaked at number 14 on the UK Singles Chart.

In October 2015, Sykes announced that his second single from the album would be called "Over and Over Again". The music video for the song was released in the UK on 28 October 2015. It was released worldwide on 20 November 2015. In March 2016, it was announced that Sykes would support the girl group Little Mix on their Get Weird Tour. Sykes announced that his third single from the album would be called "Give It Up", and would be released on 13 May 2016. The music video for "Give It Up" was released on 27 April 2016, and was later banned from television after numerous scenes were deemed unsuitable for most audiences. On 26 July 2016, Sykes announced that his debut studio album would be called Unfinished Business, and would be released on 4 November 2016. However, on 12 October 2016, Sykes announced that the album would be released one week later than originally planned on 11 November 2016.

Track listing

Charts

Certifications

References

2016 debut albums
Albums produced by Harmony Samuels
Nathan Sykes albums